Nude with Yellow Flower is a 1994 pop art painting by Roy Lichtenstein. In 2013, it sold at Christie's for $ 23,643,750.

See also
 1994 in art

References

External links
Lichtenstein Foundation website

1994 paintings
20th-century portraits
Nude art
Paintings by Roy Lichtenstein
Portraits by American artists